Pete Constant (born October 22, 1963) is an American politician from California, formerly Councilmember for District 1 of the San Jose, California City Council. Constant is a former San Jose Police Officer (1989–2000) and has owned several photography businesses. Constant was elected to the City Council during the June 2006 Primary Election and was sworn into office in January 2007.

Education
Pete Constant attended Blackford High School in San José, Ca., and received his B.A., Management degree at Saint Mary's College of California, followed by his M.A., Leadership, St. Mary's College of California

Political Contests
Pete Constant was elected June 6, 2006 with more than 64% of the vote. Pete Constant replaced Councilmember Linda LeZotte, who had served eight years before being term-limited in 2006. Constant was reelected in June 2010 with 66% in a three-way contest. His second term on the Council ended in January 2015.

City Council
During his time in office, Constant took an activist role as the sole conservative on the Council. Positions taken by Constant that attracted media attention included his proposal to prevent access to online pornography on computers at San Jose Public Libraries in 2007  and his refusal to vote for the citywide plastic bag ban in late 2010.

External links
 Smartvoter: 2006 Election Results

References 

1963 births
American municipal police officers
California Republicans
Living people
San Jose City Council members